David Alexander Hess (September 19, 1936 – October 7, 2011) was an American actor, singer, songwriter, and director. He came to prominence for his portrayals of murderous villains and gruff characters in several films in the 1970s and 1980s. 

Hess originally worked as a songwriter in the 1950s, co-writing songs recorded by Elvis Presley and Pat Boone, but garnered international attention for his feature film debut portraying Krug Stillo in Wes Craven's exploitation horror film The Last House on the Left (1972). He played several hard-edged roles as criminals and rapists in the Italian films Hitch-Hike (1977) and The House on the Edge of the Park (1980) as well as a supporting role in Craven's Swamp Thing (1982). He made his directorial debut with the slasher film To All a Goodnight (1980). 

In his later life, Hess was affiliated with the California Film Institute, where he taught improvisational theater in the institute's youth programs. He died of a heart attack on October 7, 2011 near his home in Tiburon, California after attending a local concert.

Early life
Hess was born David Alexander Hess on September 19, 1936 in New York City. His mother Marjory was an opera singer.

Career

1956–1971: Songwriting and music
In 1956, Hess recorded the original version of the Otis Blackwell composition "All Shook Up" under the stage name David Hill. The next year the song became a #1 hit single for Elvis Presley.

He began his professional career as a songwriter for Shalimar Music in 1957. He composed "Start Movin' (In My Direction)" for Sal Mineo and "Rockin' Shoes" for the Ames Brothers. In 1959, he recorded a cover version of Cliff Richard's "Living Doll" for Kapp Records, and it became a mild placed charter for him on the U.S. Billboard charts. He wrote songs for Elvis Presley throughout the 1950s and 1960s, which include "I Got Stung", "Come Along", and "Sand Castles". "Your Hand, Your Heart, Your Love" became a 1960s hit when it was performed by Andy Williams. In 1962, Hess wrote and recorded "Speedy Gonzales", (as David Dante) which became a #6 single for Pat Boone in the U.S. and a #2 in the UK, selling more than 8 million copies worldwide. Hess then recorded two solo albums for Kapp Records, again topping the charts, this time with a top 10 folk hit titled "Two Brothers."

In 1969, he became head of A&R at Mercury Records in New York. There he linked with Western classical composer John Corigliano, and together they wrote the Grammy award-winning rock opera The Naked Carmen, which became a big hit of the Berlin Ballet Week in 1970. His work with Mercury included And the Children Toll the Passing of the Day, a 1969 album he wrote for Irish actor Malachy McCourt.

1972–2011: Acting and film
In 1972, his career split into several new directions with his starring role in the Wes Craven horror classic The Last House on the Left, for which he also composed the soundtrack. In this movie, he was noted to have been a reckless, merciless character. A Method actor, he famously threatened to attack costar Sandra Peabody to get a more genuine reaction from her.

He scored , a children's film based on a collection of Jack London stories. The film won the top prize for film and direction at the Giffoni Film Festival. He also had roles in Hitchhike and The House on the Edge of the Park.

A subsequent job offer from PolyGram's German affiliate gave Hess the opportunity to move to Munich, Germany, and a multilingual career in film dubbing from 1972 to 1976 which in turn led him to writing the English language shooting scripts for German directors such as Rainer Werner Fassbinder, Reinhard Hauff, and Peter Schamoni.

In 1980, he directed To All a Good Night, his first American feature film, for Media Home Entertainment in 1980. He also appeared in two horror films directed by Ruggero Deodato: La Casa sperduta nel parco (1980) and Camping del terrore (1987). He appeared as a villain in Wes Craven's Swamp Thing in 1982.

In 1991, he played the part of the American in Peter Schamoni's Max Ernst—My Wanderings, My Unrest (1991). From 1993 to 1995, he produced Niki de Saint Phalle: Wer ist das Monster - du oder ich? (1996).

In later years, he released two albums: Caught Up in the Moment and Live & Unplugged in Hollywood, 2002. He worked on several tracks for the horror film Cabin Fever (2002), directed by Eli Roth, and worked as an improv acting teacher at the California Film Institute's Young Critics' Jury Training program.

In 2013, One Way Static Records released the soundtrack to The Last House on the Left on vinyl, compact disc, cassette and digital download. This was intended as a posthumous tribute and the liner notes on the release include extensive writings by Hess' family, colleagues and friends. This edition was repressed on a limited, hand numbered picture disc for Record Store Day in 2014.

Personal life
Hess married Regina Mardek in 1978 and had four children. He was a longtime resident of Corte Madera, California.

Death
On October 7, 2011, Hess suffered a fatal heart attack near his home in Tiburon, California while leaving a concert he had just attended. He was 75 years old.

Filmography

References

External links

David Hess - Official Site (archived)
Mad, Bad and Dangerous to Know: An Interview with David Hess - The Terror Trap - February 2011
 One Way Static Records (David's Record Label)
 David Hess recordings listed on Discogs

1936 births
2011 deaths
Male actors from New York City
American male film actors
Film producers from New York (state)
American male television actors
Method actors
20th-century American male actors
21st-century American male actors
Songwriters from New York (state)
Film directors from New York City